Luka Marić may refer to:

 Luka Marić (footballer)
 Luka Marić (geologist)